Spidia inangulata is a moth in the family Drepanidae. It was described by Watson in 1965. It is found in Cameroon and Nigeria.

References

Moths described in 1965
Drepaninae